The Pentax X90 is a superzoom bridge camera announced by Pentax on February 24, 2010.

References
http://www.dpreview.com/products/pentax/compacts/pentax_x90/specifications

Pentax cameras
Superzoom cameras
Cameras introduced in 2010